Nell I. Mondy (October 27, 1921 – August 25, 2005) was an American biochemist known for her expertise regarding the potato. She spent the majority of her profession at Cornell University where in 1953 she earned a PhD in biochemistry and subsequently served as faculty there for nearly fifty years. 
In 1997, she received the first Elizabeth Fleming Stier Award.

Biography 
Mondy was born in Pocahontas, Arkansas to her father, Daly (sometimes recorded as Daley) who worked as the county tax assessor and mother, Ethel Caroll Mondy (born February 19, 1889). Her father died of tuberculosis in 1924 when Nell was not yet 3 years old. After his death her mother took up work as a journalist. Ethel Mondy continued to live with Nell throughout the many locations her work took her.

In 1943, she received her undergraduate degree summa cum laude in chemistry at Ouachita Baptist University followed by a master's degree from the University of Texas at Austin two years later. While in Austin she became a member of Iota Sigma Pi. In 1953, she received her Ph.D. in biochemistry from Cornell University in New York State. She taught at Cornell for 48 years starting as an associate professor in nutrition. Nell never married but always lived with her mother who moved with her to Ithaca where Ethel died in 1972.

In the winter of 1996 at the age of 75, Mondy was attacked by a teenager which left her partially deaf. Due to this incident she became active in victim's rights and elder safety that prompted bills in the New York Senate and Assembly. She championed changes to the support victims receive in terms of restitution, navigating bureaucracy, emotional support, and protection.

Professional accomplishments 
Mondy left a large body of writing and research behind her. Her work can be found in numerous publications describing a wide range of topics surrounding potatoes such as how the chemical content of potatoes is affected by amendments in soil or in how they are packaged. Her first book was Experimental Food Chemistry, published in 1980.

In 1960, Mondy was instrumental in setting up the first International Food Congress after receiving a NATO Award to go to Scotland and be a part of a seminar on the recent advances in Food Science. In the middle of that decade she worked as a consultant with the R.T. French company, (known today as French's). At Florida State University she worked as a professor of food and nutrition from 1960 to 1970. Under the US Government she worked for the USDA and from 1979 to 1980 she consulted for the Environmental Protection Agency.

In 2001, she published an autobiography, You Never Fail Until You Stop Trying: The Story of a Pioneer Women Chemist. The book focuses on Dr. Mondy's challenges being a woman in science and her work to improve worldwide food and nutrition, specifically in third world countries.

Awards 
 Elizabeth Fleming Stier Award
 Honorary Member of the Graduate Women in Science for her research in biochemistry
Honorary Life Member of The Potato Association of America 
NATO Award 
In 1982 she was elected to be a fellow of the American Association for the Advancement of Science.  
In 1985 she was elected to be a fellow of the Institute of Food Technologists

References

External links 
Guide to the Nell Mondy Papers,1932-2002 at Cornell University

1921 births
2005 deaths
Women biochemists
Cornell University alumni
Cornell University faculty
Ouachita Baptist University alumni
University of Texas at Austin College of Natural Sciences alumni
20th-century American women scientists
20th-century American biochemists
American women academics
21st-century American women